The 1946 Antarctica PBM Mariner crash occurred on 30 December 1946, on Thurston Island, Antarctica when a United States Navy Martin PBM-5 Mariner crashed during a blizzard. Buno 59098 was one of 4 aircraft lost during Operation Highjump.

The crash
The aircraft, Bureau Number 59098, callsign "George 1", hit a ridge and burned while supporting Operation Highjump. The crash instantly killed Ensign Maxwell A. Lopez and Petty Officer Wendell K. Hendersin. Two hours later, Petty Officer Frederick Williams also died. LeBlanc was so frostbitten from the conditions that a quadruple amputation was performed on him. His legs were amputated on the Philippine Sea, a ship that was part of the rescue, and his arms were amputated later in Rhode Island. Hendersin, Williams, and Lopez were buried at the crash site and their remains have not been recovered.

In 2004, during a surveying flight, a Chilean navy airplane flew over the site using ground penetrating radar to discover the exact location. A two-expedition recovery mission was planned, but subsequently cancelled, for both November 2008 and November 2009 to recover the three fatalities of the crash from their temporary grave. In 2012, another group announced plans to drill  down to recover the bodies. Rich Lopez, nephew of Maxwell Lopez, was part of the plan. However the group struggled to raise the $1.5-3.5 million dollars they would need.

See also
List of Antarctica disasters by death toll

References

United States Navy in the 20th century
Accidents and incidents involving United States Navy and Marine Corps aircraft
Aviation accidents and incidents in 1946
1946 in Antarctica
Aviation accidents and incidents in Antarctica